Hypospila similis is a species of moth in the family Erebidae. It is found on Samoa and Fiji.

Subspecies
Hypospila similis similis (Samoa)
Hypospila similis fijiensis Robinson, 1965 (Fiji)

References

Moths described in 1935
Hypospila
Moths of Fiji